Silkeborg-Voel KFUM is a Danish handball club from Silkeborg and Voel. In the season 2022-2023 it plays in the Danish Women's Handball League.

Arena 
Arena: Jysk Arena 
City: Silkeborg 
Capacity: 3,000
Address: Ansvej 114, 8600 Silkeborg

Team

Current squad
Squad for the 2022–23 season 
 

 
Goalkeepers
 22  Stine Bonde
 30  Filippa Idéhn
Wingers
LW
 7  Maja Munch Laursen
 71  Emilie Bastrup Berthelsen
RW
 10  Mathilda Lundström
 17  Annika Jakobsen
Line players
 3  Josefine Videbæk
 13  Mathilde Kristensen
 97  Line Skak

Back players
LB
 5  Eira Aune
 31  Andrea West Bendtsen
 41  Emilie Steffensen 
CB
 6  Thea Hamann Rasmussen
 9  Sofie Bæk Andersen 
 18  Natasja Andreasen
RB
 2  Helene Kindberg 
 14  Carla Thomsen

Transfers
Transfers for the season 2023-24.

Joining
  Peter Schilling Laursen (Head coach) (from  Skive fH)
  Maria Holm (RB) (from  HH Elite)

Leaving 
  Jakob Andreasen (Head coach) (continue as Chairman of the club)
  Filippa Idéhn (GK) (to  Ikast Håndbold)
  Helene Kindberg (RB) (to  København Håndbold)
  Sofie Bæk Andersen (CB) (injured and contract expiry)

Technical staff
  Head Coach: Jakob Andreasen
  Assistant coach: Klaus Thomsen
  Team Leader: Lotte Toft
  Team Leader: Else Buchreitz
  Masseur: Rasmus Niebuhr
  Physiotherapist: Nicoline Wascher
  Physiotherapist: Asger Skovgaard
  Physiotherapist: Thea Molsgaard

Notable players 

 Trine Troelsen (2015-2017) 
 Anne Cecilie de la Cour (2013-2015)
 Jette Hansen (2009-2012, 2014-2015, 2016-2018)
 Anna Sophie Okkels (2017-2018)
 Louise Lyksborg (2016-2019)
 Stephanie Andersen (2012-2014, 2016-2019)
 Mathilde Bjerregaard (2015-2017)
 Andrea West Bendtsen (2016-2019)
 Freja Cohrt (2015-2017) 
 Rikke Iversen (2014-2020) 
 Camilla Maibom (2014-2016) 
 Susan Thorsgaard (2006-2008) 
 Daniella Dragojevic (2013-2014, 2015-2017)
 Simone Böhme (2012-2015)
 Stine Skogrand (2016-2018)
 Hege Bakken Wahlquist (2017-2021)
 Hanna Bredal Oftedal (2019)
 Michaela Ek (2014-2015)
 Filippa Idéhn (2018-2019)
 Sara Kececi (2014-2016)
 Susann Müller (2018-2019)

Kit manufacturers
 Adidas

European record

See also 
Bjerringbro-Silkeborg

External links 
 Officiel website 

Danish handball clubs
Sports clubs founded by the YMCA